The University Act was enacted by the Legislative Assembly of British Columbia to establish degree-granting universities for British Columbia. The first University Act was passed in 1890, which act continues in force and defines the first Convocation of The University of British Columbia. A subsequent Act was passed in 1908 (in conjunction with the University Endowment Act of 1907). Under this new statute, the governance of the University of British Columbia was clarified.

See also
Universities Act

External links
 University Act

University of British Columbia
1890 in British Columbia
1890 in education
1890 in law
University-related legislation